The Baños del Flaco Formation is a Late Jurassic to Early Cretaceous (Tithonian to Berriasian geologic formation in central Chile. The formation comprises limestones and sandstones deposited in a shallow marine to fluvial environment. Fossil ornithopod tracks have been reported from the formation.

Fossil content 
Among others, the following fossils have been found in the formation:
Ichnofossils
 Camptosaurichnus fasolae
 Iguanodonichnus frenkii
 Ornithopoda indet.
 Theropoda indet.

 Ammonites, echinoderms and bivalves

See also 
 List of dinosaur-bearing rock formations
 List of stratigraphic units with ornithischian tracks
 Ornithopod tracks
 Arcabuco Formation, contemporaneous ichnofossil-bearing formation in Colombia
 Chacarilla Formation, contemporaneous ichnofossil-bearing formation in northern Chile
 Coihaique Group, contemporaneous fossiliferous formation in the Aysén Basin

References

Bibliography

Further reading 
 C. Salazar and W. Stinnesbeck. 2016. Tithonian–Berriasian ammonites from the Baños del Flaco Formation, central Chile. Journal of Systematic Palaeontology 14:149-182
 A. P. Larrain and L. Biró-Bagóczky. 1985. New Pygurus (Echinodermata: Echinoidea) from the Tithonian of central Chile: first record from the Jurassic of the southern hemisphere. Journal of Paleontology 59(6):1409-1413

Geologic formations of Chile
Jurassic System of South America
Lower Cretaceous Series of South America
Cretaceous Chile
Jurassic Chile
Berriasian Stage
Tithonian Stage
Sandstone formations
Limestone formations
Fluvial deposits
Shallow marine deposits
Ichnofossiliferous formations
Formation